is a passenger railway station located in the city of Himeji, Hyōgo Prefecture, Japan, operated by West Japan Railway Company (JR West).

Lines

Station layout
The station consists of one elevated island platform with the station building underneath. The station is unattended.

Platforms

Adjacent stations

|-
!colspan=5|West Japan Railway Company

History
Nozato Station opened on July 26, 1894.  With the privatization of the Japan National Railways (JNR) on April 1, 1987, the station came under the aegis of the West Japan Railway Company.

Passenger statistics
In fiscal 2016, the station was used by an average of 1851 passengers daily.

Surrounding area
 Himeji Nishinakajima Post Office
 Himeji City Library Hanakita Annex (Reopened on April 13, 2019)
 Hananokita Citizen's Square

See also
List of railway stations in Japan

References

External links

  

Railway stations in Himeji
Bantan Line
Railway stations in Japan opened in 1894